Pyrausta posticalis is a moth of the family Crambidae. It can be found in  Madagascar.

It has a wingspan of 24–27 mm.

References

Moths described in 1880
posticalis
Moths of Madagascar
Moths of Africa